Negera clenchi is a moth in the family Drepanidae. It was described by Watson in 1965. It is found in Cameroon.

The length of the forewings is about 23 mm. The colour-pattern of the fore- and hindwings is as Negera confusa. The forewings are buff with a lustrous, pinkish medial area and a large black spot near the base of the wing, as well as a black discocellular spot and apical marking, and black speckling at the anal angle. The hindwings are pinkish buff, speckled distally with dark brown and black, but reddish brown at the outer angle.

References

Endemic fauna of Cameroon
Moths described in 1965
Drepaninae
Moths of Africa